Jardín Hidalgo is a plaza in Tlaquepaque, in the Mexican state of Jalisco.

References

External links

 

Plazas in Jalisco
Tlaquepaque